George Kleinsinger (February 13, 1914, San Bernardino, California – July 28, 1982, New York City, New York) was an American composer. His works include his collaboration with Paul Tripp on the 1940s children's classical-music piece "Tubby the Tuba". He also wrote the music for the phonograph record Archy & Mehitabel and the Broadway musical Shinbone Alley, based on the record. For the last 25 years of his life, he was a resident at New York's famous Chelsea Hotel.

References
History of "Tubby the Tuba" at official site. Retrieved April 9, 2007.

External links
 
 
 

1914 births
1982 deaths
20th-century classical composers
American male composers
Musicians from California
20th-century American composers
20th-century American male musicians